Gerard and Marcel Granollers were the defending champions but chose not to defend their title.

Lloyd Harris and Dudi Sela won the title after defeating Mirza Bašić and Tomislav Brkić 6–3, 6–7(3–7), [10–8] in the final.

Seeds

Draw

References
 Main draw

Burnie International - Men's Doubles